Charles "Charlie" Sage (birth unknown – death unknown) was a Welsh rugby union and professional rugby league footballer who played in the 1920s.

International honours
Charlie Sage won caps for Wales while at Hunslet in 1925 against England (2-matches).

References

Glamorgan County RFC players
Hunslet F.C. (1883) players
Mountain Ash RFC players
Place of birth missing
Place of death missing
Rugby league hookers
Rugby league props
Wales national rugby league team players
Welsh rugby league players
Welsh rugby union players
Year of birth missing
Year of death missing